Articles (arranged alphabetically) related to Jordan include:



0-9
1948 Arab–Israeli War
1949 Armistice Agreements
1967 Arab-Israeli War
1973 Arab-Israeli War
2011 Jordanian protests

A
Agriculture in Jordan
Ahel Al Himmeh
Airlines of Jordan
Airports in Jordan
Al Hussein Public Parks
Amman Stock Exchange
Arab Legion
Arab Spring in Jordan (2011) 
Arab–Israeli War (1948)
Arab–Israeli War (1967)
Arab-Israeli War (1973)
Armistice Agreements (1949)
Art in Jordan
ATV Jordan
Azraq, Jordan

Azraq refugee camp

B
Badr Brigade in the Jordanian Army
Battle of Karameh
Battles of Latrun (1948)
Birds of Jordan
Black September in Jordan
Blasphemy law in Jordan
Boy Scouts in Jordan

C
Cabinet of Jordan
Center for Strategic Studies Jordan
Central Bank of Jordan
Chamber of Deputies of Jordan
Christianity in Jordan
Cities in Jordan
Companies of Jordan
Constitution of Jordan
Copyright law
Correction centres in Jordan
Culture of Jordan

D
Dairat al-Mukhabarat al-Ammah
Demographics of Jordan
Desert Force

E
Economy of Jordan
Education in Jordan
Elections in Jordan
Emirate of Transjordan

F
Films produced in Jordan
Foreign relations of Jordan
Freedom of religion in Jordan

G
Geography of Jordan
Girl Guides in Jordan
Government of Jordan
Governorates of Jordan
Greek-Jordanian relations

H
Hania Mufti
Health in Jordan
Higher Population Council
Highway 65 (Jordan)
His Majesty's Special Security
History of Jordan
HIV/AIDS in Jordan
Hospitals in Jordan
Human rights in Jordan
Human trafficking in Jordan
Husainyyat

I
International rankings of Jordan
Irbid
Islam in Jordan
Israel–Jordan peace treaty

J
Jadara University
Jerash Local Government
Jordan
Jordan at the Olympics
Jordan Atomic Energy Commission
Jordan Investment Board
Jordan News Agency
 Jordanian annexation of the West Bank 
Jordan University of Science and Technology
Jordan Radioactive Storage Facility

Jordan–Syria relations

Jordan – United States Free Trade Agreement
Jordanian Armed Forces
Jordanian Association for Boy Scouts and Girl Guides
Jordanian copyright law
Jordanian dinar
Jordanian military ranks
Jordanian passport
Jordanian protests (2011)
Jordanians
JRTV

K
King Abdullah Design and Development Bureau
Kings of Jordan

L
Law enforcement in Jordan
LGBT rights in Jordan (Gay rights)
Line of succession to the Jordanian throne
List of airlines of Jordan
List of airports in Jordan
List of birds of Jordan
List of cities in Jordan
List of companies of Jordan
List of hospitals in Jordan
List of Jordanian films
List of Jordanians
List of kings of Jordan
List of mammals of Jordan
List of nature reserves in Jordan
List of newspapers in Jordan
List of people from Irbid
List of political parties in Jordan
List of prime ministers of Jordan

List of Syrian refugee camps in Jordan

M
Ma'an
Mammals of Jordan
Medical education in Jordan
Ministry of Higher Education and Scientific Research (Jordan)
Mount Nebo (Jordan)

Mrajeeb Al Fhood refugee camp

N
Nader al-Dahabi
Nahias of Jordan
Nature reserves in Jordan
Newspapers in Jordan
Nuclear energy in Jordan

O
Oil shale in Jordan
Order of the Star of Jordan
Outline of Jordan

P

Palestinians in Jordan
Parliament of Jordan
People from Jordan
Petra
Petra University
Political parties in Jordan
Politics of Jordan
Portal:Jordan
Postage stamps and postal history of Jordan
Prince Faisal bin Al Hussein
Prime Ministers of Jordan
Public holidays in Jordan

Q

R
Religion in Jordan
Roman Catholicism in Jordan
Royal Jordanian Air Force
Royal Jordanian Falcons
Royal Jordanian Land Force
Royal Naval Force
Royal Scientific Society
Royal Special Forces

Rukban

S
Science and technology in Jordan
Sakib
Salt, Jordan
Samir Rifai
Senate of Jordan
Shatna
Six-Day War (1967 Arab-Israeli War)
Sport in Jordan

Syrians in Jordan

T
Talal of Jordan
Telecommunications in Jordan
Telephone numbers in Jordan
Tourism in Jordan
Transjordan (region)
Transjordan Frontier Force
Transport in Jordan

U

Universities in Jordan
Umm Qais
Umm Zuwaytinah
University of Jordan

V
Vehicle registration plates of Jordan

W
Water politics in the Jordan River basin
Water supply and sanitation in Jordan
Women in Jordan

X

Y
Yom Kippur War (1973 Arab-Israeli War)

Z
Zaatari refugee camp
Zarqa
Zarqa Governorate
Zarqa Private University

See also

 Lists of country-related topics

Jordan
Jordan